HLA-DR52 is an HLA-DR serotype that recognizes gene products of HLA-DRB3 locus. Three allele groups can produce 35 isoforms.

DRB3, DRB4, and DRB5 are minor DR beta-encoding loci, and they have been recognized as having distinct evolution, having diverged from DRB1 around 4 million years ago.

The DRB3 locus is only apparent in a small subset of DR haplotypes, and most individuals lack DRB3.

Alleles

Associated diseases

DR52 serotype is positively associated with systemic sclerosis, inflammatory myopathies, inclusion body myositis,

DRB3*01 is positively associated with sarcoidosis, Grave's Disease, pulmonary sarcoidosis,

DRB3*0101:DRB1*0301 is linked to Lofgren's syndrome

DRB3*0202 is also linked to  Grave's disease, serum IgG antibodies to Chlamydia pneumoniae with essential hypertension,  acute necrotizing encephalopathy

DRB3*0301 is weakly associated with anticardiolipin antibodies in SLE

DRB3*0301:DRB1*1302 may be associated with Crohn's disease

DRB1 linkage
HLA-DRB3 is linked to these HLA-DR serotypes and DRB1 allele groups:

HLA-DR3 - DRB1*03

HLA-DR5 -
 HLA-DR11 - DRB1*11
 HLA-DR12 - DRB1*12

HLA-DR6 -
 HLA-DR13 - DRB1*13
 HLA-DR14 - DRB1*14

HLA-DR52 - Sjögren syndrome

References

HLA-DR haplotypes